The Islami Oikya Jote (Islami Oikko Joţ, "Islamic Unity Front") is a political party in Bangladesh and is allied with the Four Party Alliance.

History 

During the legislative elections of 1 October 2001, the party won 2 out of 300 elected members in an alliance with the Bangladesh Nationalist Party. It was led by Mufti Fazlul Huq Amini and Azizul Haq.

In 2013, the party called upon its community to «severe ties» with atheists and the enemies of Islam, and to take it out in the streets to «foil conspiracies against Islam», and specifically asked the media not to associate this announcement with any other Islamic party whatsoever.

A 2015 article in the journal Prothom Alo stated that the party had been inactive «in recent years». The spokesperson of the party said most of the party's activity happens over the phone.

In January 2016 Islami Oikya Jote Chairman Abdul Latif Nezami announced to quit BNP-led 20-party alliance at a press conference. The OIJ chieh also stated that it is for their organization's interest. But after a few hours of the announcement of Islami Oikya Jote's quitting the BNP-led 20-party alliance, a faction of the Islamist party declared that it would remain with the coalition. In April 2016, the Islami Oikya Jote congratulated the prime minister's decision to lash out the «atheist bloggers» behind the Ganajagaran Mancha's movement for highest punishment for 1971 war criminals. In July 2016, a faction of the party accused the Jamaat-e-Islami to be behind the recent terrorist attacks in Bangladesh.

In March 2017, the Islami Oikya Jote expressed its desire to see all Islamic parties run independently for the 2019 elections in Bangladesh. In 2017, the party repeatedly warned that all non-Islamic idols must be banned from public places, including the Lady Justice statue in front of the Supreme Court. In July 2017, Islami Oika Jote formed a new alliance of Islamic parties to weigh against the Jamaat-e-Islami.

Student wing 
The student wing of Islami Oikya Jote is the Islami Chhatra Khelafat. They took part in the 2013 Shapla Square protests in support of Hefazat-e-Islam Bangladesh.

Leaders

Mufti Fazlul Huq Amini and Azizul Haq were the two most influential leaders of the party.

See also 
 List of Deobandi organisations

References

External links

 
Islamic political parties in Bangladesh
Islamist groups
Far-right politics in Bangladesh
Political parties in Bangladesh
Political parties with year of establishment missing
Deobandi organisations
21st-century Bangladeshi women politicians
Women members of the Jatiya Sangsad